King Køng was a German alternative rock band established in 1989 and officially declared defunct in 1999, though its last album was released in 1992. It was formed by Farin Urlaub after the split of Die Ärzte in 1988, with the band's former producer, Uwe Hoffmann, on drums.

Discography

Albums  
1990: King Who? (Re-Release 2006)
1991: General Theory (Re-Release 2006)
1992: Life itself Is Sweet, Sweet, Sweet!

Singles
1990: Flying
1990: Money/Underground

Promos
1990: King Who? (album promo)
1990: Peels (promo-vinyl-single)
1990: Money (promo-vinyl-single)
1990: The Complete Mahaze Vol. 1 (limited on 1000 copies as vinyl-single)
1991: General Theory (album promo)
1992: Don't Let Me Be Misunderstood (promo-CD; Nina Simone cover)

German musical groups